Bobino at 20 rue de la Gaîté, in the Montparnasse area of Paris (14th arrondissement), France, is a music hall theatre that has seen most of the biggest names of 20th century French music perform there.

During its long history it was also known as Les Folies Bobino (1873), Studio Bobino (1991), Gaieté Bobino and Bobin’o (2007).

History 

Started by Lisa Bennie, Bobino began as a dance hall in 1800, became a theatre in 1873, and was converted back to a music hall in 1926.

Bobino was one of the most popular entertainment spots in France during the 1920s and 1930s. On April 8, 1975 Josephine Baker, the African American superstar of France who had appeared at Bobino beginning in the 1920s, gave her last performance there at the age of 68.

After 183 years, Bobino closed its doors in 1983, but reopened in 1991.  In 2007, Gerard Louvin and Stéphane Cherki turned Bobino into a cabaret named Bobin'o.

Performers 

The entertainers who have performed at Bobino include:

Charles Aznavour
Josephine Baker
Guy Béart
Gilbert Bécaud
Georges Brassens
Lucienne Boyer
Jacques Brel
Annie Cordy
The Cramps
Dalida
Marie-Louise Damien (Damia)
Patachou
Lucienne Delyle
Marie Dubas
Georges Guibourg
Juliette Gréco
Léo Ferré
Pauline Julien
Alice Prin (Kiki de Montparnasse)
Daniel Lavoie
Félix Leclerc
Emma Liébel
Magma
Félix Mayol
Mireille Hartuch
Mistinguett
Yves Montand
Georges Moustaki
Édith Piaf
Henri Betti
Frida Boccara
Serge Reggiani
Amália Rodrigues
Monique Serf (Barbara)
Charles Trenet
Tereza Kesovija
Jocelyne Jocya
a-ha
Amy Winehouse
MozART group
Avenue Q (musical)

In literature 

Joris-Karl Huysmans frequented the Bobino and used these experiences as a reference for his first published novel, Marthe. The Bobino is featured prominently as the lead character's place of employment.

References 

 this article includes material translated from the French Wikipedia version accessed 9/21/2010

External links 

 Bobino official website
 Stéphane Cherki official website

Music halls in Paris
Theatres in Paris
Buildings and structures in the 14th arrondissement of Paris